Ubiquitin specific peptidase 19 is a protein that in humans is encoded by the USP19 gene.

References

External links 
 PDBe-KB provides an overview of all the structure information available in the PDB for Human Ubiquitin carboxyl-terminal hydrolase 19 (USP19)

Further reading 

Genes
Human proteins